Qeshlaq-e Babash may refer to:
 Qeshlaq-e Babash-e Olya
 Qeshlaq-e Babash-e Sofla